An aircraft fire trainer is a firefighting simulator designed to practice rescue of passengers and crew during an 
aircraft accident. Aircraft fire training simulators allow firefighters to re-create different emergency scenarios such as large-scale external fuel spill, wing, engine and tail fires. They can also help to develop realistic internal rescue scenarios for seat, cockpit, cabin and cargo fire. Fire training simulators also offer flexibility for the right training activity while providing maximum safety at all times. They are used by  municipal, industrial fire and rescue departments, international airports and military throughout the world. Ground collisions and accidents can be created as a part of a large-scale training exercise involving fire, ambulance and police cruise, ground staff and air crews. In addition, secondary incidents can be developed providing training on controlling incidents that can occur around the aircraft. Every activity is managed and viewed from the control tower.

When aircraft crash, specialized firefighting and rescue tactics are required.  However, using multi million dollar aircraft is not a viable option - even for the largest of companies. Full size mock-ups of several types of aircraft exist that are realistic training tools. These are dramatically less expensive to produce and are reusable.

References

External links
Transportation Safety Board
Rescue Fire Fighting Information Resource

Firefighter training
Aircraft rescue and firefighting